The 33rd Dáil was elected at the 2020 general election on 8 February 2020 and first met on 20 February 2020. The members of Dáil Éireann, the house of representatives of the Oireachtas (legislature) of Ireland, are known as TDs. There are 160 TDs in the 33rd Dáil, an increase of 2. The 33rd Dáil lasted  days to date.

Composition of the 33rd Dáil

Government coalition parties denoted with bullets
Notes

Ceann Comhairle
The Ceann Comhairle is automatically returned unless they state their intention to retire before the Dáil is dissolved. The outgoing Ceann Comhairle, Seán Ó Fearghaíl, did not retire. The first order of business of the new Dáil was to elect a new Ceann Comhairle. Ó Fearghaíl and Denis Naughten were both nominated, and Ó Fearghaíl was re-elected as Ceann Comhairle in a secret ballot.

Leadership
 Ceann Comhairle: Seán Ó Fearghaíl (Fianna Fáil)
 Leas-Cheann Comhairle: Catherine Connolly (Independent)

Government

 Taoiseach and Leader of Fine Gael
 Leo Varadkar
 Tánaiste and Leader of Fianna Fáil
Micheál Martin
Leader of the Green Party and Minister for Transport, Environment,  Climate and Communications
Eamon Ryan

Opposition
Opposition Front Bench
Leader of the Opposition and Leader of Sinn Féin: Mary Lou McDonald
Leader of the Labour Party: Ivana Bacik
Leader of the Social Democrats: Holly Cairns
Leader of Aontú: Peadar Tóibín

List of TDs 
Of the 160 TDs, forty-eight were elected for the first time. 36 are women (22.5%) and 124 are men.

The list is given in alphabetical order by constituency. Party affiliations are given as they were at the time of election.

Technical groups

Regional Group

Rural Group

Independent Group

Changes

See also
Members of the 26th Seanad

Notes

References

Further reading

External links
Houses of the Oireachtas: Debates: 33rd Dáil
33rd Dáil General Election Results Houses of the Oireachtas
L&RS Infographic: General Election 2020 – A Statistical Profile Houses of the Oireachtas

 
33rd Dáil
2020 in the Republic of Ireland
33
I